Aparviz was an Iranian aristocrat, who served as the marzban (general of a frontier province, "margrave") of Sakastan in the 7th-century.

He is first mentioned in 650/1 during the Arab invasion of Iran, where is mentioned as surrendering to the Rashidun Arabs; when he consulted the Arab military officer Rabi ibn Ziyad Harithi, the latter was using the bodies of two dead soldiers as a chair. This horrified Aparviz, who in order to save the inhabitants of Sakastan, made peace with the Arabs in return for heavy tribute. Two years later, the inhabitants of Sakastan rebelled against the Arabs, however, no mention of Aparviz is made.

Sources

 

 

Generals of Yazdegerd III
Year of birth unknown
Year of death unknown
Sasanian governors of Sakastan
7th-century Iranian people